Jean E. Graham, Ph.D. is an American scholar, translator, and professor of English at The College of New Jersey, where she has taught since 1994. She regularly teaches courses in British literature (especially Milton and Shakespeare), young adult literature, and the Bible as literature. Her research interests are varied: topics of recent publications and current projects include Katherine Philips, Thomas Traherne, and C. S. Lewis’s Narnian chronicles.

Education 
Dr. Graham earned her Ph.D. in English Language and Literature from Case Western Reserve University in Cleveland, Ohio, where she participated in a David Hudson Fellowship. Prior to her doctoral studies, Graham received her B.A. and M.A. in English from The University of Akron.

Teaching 
Dr. Graham has recently taught courses on the following topics: Poetry; Early Modern British Literature; Shakespeare and Gender; Bible as Literature; John Milton; and Dystopian Literature. Prior to joining to English Department at TCNJ, Graham was served as a Visiting Assistant Professor at The University of Akron from 1991 to 1994.

Publications 
  “Austen and ‘The Advantage of Height.’” Persuasions 20 (summer 1999).
  “‘Ay me’: Selfishness and Empathy in ‘Lycidas.’” Early Modern Literary Studies: A Journal of 16th- and 17th-Century English Literature 2 (Dec. 1996).
  “Fruit So Various: A Word Analysis in Paradise Lost.” Milton Quarterly 24 (March 1990): 25-30.    
  “Holodeck Masquing: Early Modern Genre Meets Star Trek.” Journal of Popular Culture 34 (fall 2000): 21-27.  
  “Katherine Philips and Churching.”  The Explicator 70 (August 2012): 161-63. 
  “Milton’s Comus in Ann Radcliffe’s The Mysteries of Udolpho.” The Explicator 72, 2 (May 2014): 97-100.  
  “The Performing Heir in Jonson's Jacobean Masques.” SEL: Studies in English Literature 1500–1900 41 (spring 2001): 381-98.  
  “‘Seventy Seven’ in Ben Jonson’s The Alchemist.”  The Explicator 70 (December 2012): 256-59.
   “Who ‘laid him in a manger’?  Biblical Women in Herbert, Vaughan, and Traherne.”  Explorations in Renaissance Culture 41 (2015): 56-74. 
   “‘Wo’is me’ and ‘Ah my deare’: Parenthetical Metacommentary in Donne and Herbert.” The John Donne Journal 33 (2014). 165-201.

References 

Living people
American academics of English literature
Case Western Reserve University alumni
University of Akron alumni
The College of New Jersey faculty
Year of birth missing (living people)